Marwood Godfrey Marchant (18 June 1922 – 28 June 1972) was a Welsh professional footballer who scored 22 goals from 52 appearances in the Football League, playing as an inside forward for Cardiff City and Torquay United.

Career
Marchant was playing non-league football for Milford United before signing for Cardiff City in 1950. He scored six goals during the 1950–51 season, including a brace and a single goal in 8–0 and 7–1 thrashings of Welsh league sides Barry Town and Bangor City in the opening rounds of the Welsh Cup and the only goal of the South Wales derby match against Swansea Town on 24 March 1951. However, he struggled to oust more established forwards such as Wilf Grant from the starting line-up.

Prior to the introduction of loan deals, Cardiff had a working relationship with Torquay United to transfer players needing Football League experience to the Devon-based club in exchange for first rights on any players Cardiff wished to sign from Torquay and, the following year, Marchant was sent to the Gulls. He spent two years at Plainmoor, averaging nearly a goal every other game but left the club in 1953 and returned to non-league football with Pembroke Borough.

References

1922 births
1972 deaths
Welsh footballers
Association football inside forwards
Cardiff City F.C. players
Torquay United F.C. players
English Football League players
People from Milford Haven
Sportspeople from Pembrokeshire
Pembroke Borough A.F.C. players
Milford United F.C. players